Luigi Maria Marelli (1858-1936) was an Italian prelate named by pope Benedict XV bishop of Bergamo.

Life 
Born in Milan, Marelli was appointed bishop of Bobbio by pope Pius X in 1907 and in 1914 after the death of Giacomo Radini-Tedeschi he was transferred to the see of Bergamo. In 1920 pope Benedict XV sent to Marelli a letter, in the letter the pope affirmed the duty of the church to fight against Socialism but he also reaffirmed the importance of social teaching of Catholic Church 
Marelli died in 1936 in Rho, Lombardy.

References

External links and additional sources
 (for Chronology of Bishops) 
 (for Chronology of Bishops) 

1858 births
1936 deaths
Clergy from Milan
20th-century Italian Roman Catholic bishops
Bishops of Bergamo